Ponder is a town in Denton County, Texas, United States.  The population was 2,442 in 2020.

History
The community has the name of the local Ponder family.

Local legend holds that Bonnie and Clyde either robbed the Ponder State Bank or attempted to rob it, only to discover it had gone broke the week before.  However, this is not listed in the Barrow Gang's activities.  The robbery in question may have been committed by the less famous but more successful Eddie Bentz.

Geography

Ponder is located at  (33.179741, –97.285805).

Demographics

As of the 2020 United States census, there were 2,442 people, 798 households, and 600 families residing in the town.

Education
Ponder is served by the Ponder Independent School District, which operates Ponder High School.

Notable people

 Joe McQueen (1919–2019), jazz musician, born in Ponder

Photo gallery

References

Dallas–Fort Worth metroplex
Towns in Denton County, Texas
Towns in Texas